Buniewice  is a village in the administrative district of Gmina Kamień Pomorski, within Kamień County, West Pomeranian Voivodeship, in north-western Poland.

The village has an approximate population of 300.

References

Villages in Kamień County